is a professional Japanese 9 dan Go player.

In 1961, Tsuchida became a pupil at the dojo of Minoru Kitani, and reached 9 dan in 1979. His pupils at the Nihon Ki-in have included Hideki Matsuoka, Masaki Ogata and Yoshika Mizuno. Tsuchida is an affiliate of the Nihon Ki-in in Nagoya, Japan.

Notes

Japanese Go players
1944 births
Living people